BKW may refer to:

 Beckley Raleigh County Memorial Airport,  West Virginia, US, IATA code
 BKW FMB Energie AG, a Swiss power utility
 Burger King, NYSE stock symbol
 Berkswell railway station, West Midlands, UK, station code
 BKW Partners, a San Francisco, California technology creative agency
 BKW Health, a San Francisco, California healthcare creative agency